The 2018 California lieutenant gubernatorial election was held on November 6, 2018, to elect the Lieutenant Governor of California. Incumbent Democratic Lieutenant Governor Gavin Newsom was ineligible to run for reelection due to term limits and ran for Governor of California instead. Democrats Eleni Kounalakis and Ed Hernandez faced each other in the general election, as no Republican finished in the top two positions of the nonpartisan blanket primary that was held on June 5, 2018.

Primary

Candidates

Democratic Party

Declared
 Jeff Bleich, former United States Ambassador to Australia
 Cameron Gharabiklou, attorney and businessman
 Ed Hernandez, state senator
 Eleni Kounalakis, former United States Ambassador to Hungary

Declined
 Kevin de León, President pro tempore of the California State Senate (running for U.S. Senate)
 Mike Gatto, State Assemblyman (running for State Treasurer)
 Mark Leno, former State Senator (running for Mayor of San Francisco)
 John Pérez, former Speaker of the California State Assembly
 Darrell Steinberg, Mayor of Sacramento and former State Senator

Republican Party

Declared
 David Fennell, venture capitalist
 Cole Harris, businessman
 David Hernandez, retired business owner
 Lydia Ortega, San Jose State University economics professor
 Matthew Salzer, micronationlist (write-in)

Declined
 Tom Berryhill, state senator
 Anthony Cannella, state senator

Libertarian Party

Declared
 Tim Ferreira

No Party Preference

Declared
 Gayle McLaughlin, former Mayor of Richmond
 Danny Thomas

Endorsements

Polling

Results

By county
Results by county. Blue represents counties won by Kounalakis and counties with Democratic vote majorities. Red represents counties won by Harris and counties with Republican vote majorities. Cyan represents counties won by Ed Hernandez. Orange represents counties won by Fennell. Light blue represents counties with Democratic vote pluralities. Light red represents counties with Republican vote pluralities.

General election

Endorsements

Polling

Results

Results by county 
Blue represents counties won by Kounalakis. Cyan represents counties won by Hernandez.

See also
California gubernatorial election, 2018
California State Treasurer election, 2018

References

External links
Eleni Kounalakis (D) for Lieutenant Governor
Ed Hernandez (D) for Lieutenant Governor

Lieutenant Governor
California
2018